The 205th Coastal Division was an infantry division of the Royal Italian Army during World War II. Royal Italian Army coastal divisions were second line divisions formed with reservists and equipped with second rate materiel. Recruited locally, they were often commanded by officers called out of retirement.

History

Sardinia 
The division was activated on 15 January 1942 in Iglesias by reorganizing the V Coastal Sector Command. The division was assigned to XIII Army Corps, which was responsible for the defense of the southern half of the island of Sardinia. The division was based in Carbonia and responsible for the coastal defense from Torre Foghe down the western coast of Sardinia to, but excluding Capo Pula. The division's area of responsibility included the Gulf of Oristano and the south-western coast of Sardinia with the islands of Sant'Antioco and San Pietro. On 1 August 1942 the XXXIII Coastal Brigade was activated and took over the responsibility for the defense of the coast from Torre Foghe down to approximately Punta Usai. The XXXIII Coastal Brigade's area of responsibility including the entire Gulf of Oristano.

The 205th Coastal Division, together with the 203rd Coastal Division, 204th Coastal Division, IV Coastal Brigade, and XXXIII Coastal Brigade formed a first static defense line against allied landings on the island. Further inland the 30th Infantry Division "Sabauda", 31st Infantry Division "Calabria", 47th Infantry Division "Bari", and 184th Paratroopers Division "Nembo" were the mobile forces of the Armed Forces Command Sardinia.

After the announcement of the Armistice of Cassibile on 8 September 1943 the division, together with all other divisions on Sardinia, refused German demands to surrender. Realizing the futility of attempting to gain control of Sardinia the German forces on the island retreated to Corsica.

US Army Air Force 
The division joined the Italian Co-belligerent Army and was renamed 205th Division. In November 1944 the division was shipped to Naples and in December 1944 it was assigned to the US Army Air Force's American Air Forces in the Mediterranean to provide auxiliary services at American airfields in mainland Italy. The division consisted of about 5,000 men and fielded 48 aviation services companies and six transport companies. In August 1945 the division was reduced in size and in 1946 it was disbanded.

Organization 
 205th Coastal Division, in Carbonia
 127th Coastal Regiment
 CDII Coastal Battalion
 CDVII Coastal Battalion
 128th Coastal Regiment
 XCII Territorial Battalion
 CDVI Coastal Battalion
 CDXXXVIII Coastal Battalion
 129th Coastal Regiment
 CCCXCVI Coastal Battalion
 CDIV Coastal Battalion
 CDV Coastal Battalion
 CDXXII Coastal Battalion
 CDXXXVI Coastal Battalion
 47th Coastal Artillery Regiment
 XIV Coastal Artillery Group
 XVII Coastal Artillery Group
 XXVIII Coastal Artillery Group
 LXXXIII Coastal Artillery Group
 CCXVII Coastal Artillery Group
 48th Coastal Artillery Regiment
 XVIII Coastal Artillery Group
 XXIX Coastal Artillery Group
 LXXXI Coastal Artillery Group
 XCIII Coastal Artillery Group
 CCXXIX Coastal Artillery Group
 CIII Machine Gun Battalion
 163 Machine Gun Company
 165 Machine Gun Company
 205th Mixed Engineer Company
 205th Carabinieri Section
 217th Field Post Office
 Division Services

Attached to the division:
 Tactical Sector Oristano, in Oristano (responsible for the defense of the Gulf of Oristano; became the XXXIII Coastal Brigade on 1 August 1942)
 132nd Coastal Regiment
 CDIII Coastal Battalion
 CDXXI Coastal Battalion
 925th Coastal Regiment
 CMV Coastal Battalion
 CMVI Coastal Battalion
 CMVII Coastal Battalion

Commanding officers 
The division's commanding officer was:

 Generale di Divisione Giovanni Manildo (15 January 1942 - 1944)

References 

 
 

Coastal divisions of Italy
Infantry divisions of Italy in World War II